Eliphalet Lockwood (1741 – 1814) was a nine-term member of the Connecticut House of Representatives from Norwalk in the sessions of May and October 1790, May and October 1791, October 1794, May and October 1795, May and October 1796. He served as a captain in the Connecticut Militia during the American Revolutionary War.

He was the son of Deacon Peter Lockwood and Mary Hawley.

At the beginning of the war, on July 12, 1775, Lockwood enlisted in the First Company of Colonel Charles Webb's Seventh Connecticut Regiment, and was discharged December 24, 1775.

In 1778, he was assistant commissary of issues of the Fifth Regiment.

On July 21, 1778, he gave his bond for $5000 as security to Henry Laurens, Esq., President of the Continental Congress or his successor in office, for faithfully executing the office and trust of an Assistant Commissary of Issues in the American Army.

Lockwood organized the first voluntary fire department in Norwalk. His home was one of those lost when the British burned Norwalk.

In 1780 captain of the coast guards.

References

External links 
 The Hour - Eliphalet Lockwood

1741 births
1814 deaths
Connecticut militiamen in the American Revolution
Members of the Connecticut House of Representatives
Politicians from Norwalk, Connecticut
Military personnel from Connecticut